The Logan Square Boulevards Historic District is a linear historic district in the Logan Square community area of North Side, Chicago. It encompasses  of the Chicago boulevard system.

The district includes sections of Logan Boulevard, Kedzie Avenue, and Humboldt Boulevard. It also includes two parks, Logan Square and Palmer Square, which connect the boulevards.

Grassy medians run down the center of the boulevards; the medians and the two squares both provided recreational areas for residents and drew development to the area. Logan Square also includes the Illinois Centennial Monument, which was erected in 1918 to celebrate Illinois' centennial.

The boulevards pass through residential areas and are lined with homes in a variety of architectural styles. Some of the most common designs are sandstone Romanesque houses, gray stone Victorian houses, and brick buildings with Tudor Revival and Prairie School styles.

The district was added to the National Register of Historic Places on November 20, 1985. It was named a Chicago Landmark on November 1, 2005.

References

Historic districts in Chicago
North Side, Chicago
Streets in Chicago
Boulevards in the United States
National Register of Historic Places in Chicago
Historic districts on the National Register of Historic Places in Illinois
Prairie School architecture in Illinois
Romanesque Revival architecture in Illinois
Tudor Revival architecture in Illinois
Victorian architecture in Illinois
Chicago Landmarks